Rusty's Real Deal Baseball is a free-to-play baseball video game published by Nintendo for the Nintendo 3DS eShop. It was released in Japan in August 2013 and in North America in April 2014; the game was not released in Europe.

Gameplay

The game features baseball themed minigames, which can be purchased individually at Rusty Slugger's store, called "Rusty Slugger's Sport Shack".  The player is given a free demo of one of the minigames, but will eventually need to pay for them.  While each minigame is paid through microtransactions, players can haggle with Rusty to purchase the games for a lower price.  Playing the minigames will reward players with items that can be used to haggle with Rusty, which Rusty will accept and use to fix his life problems.  One of Rusty's children will tell you if the price can not be lowered any further, and if a player chooses an ineffective option of dialogue, they can reset Rusty's mood with a donut for a better approach. Players can compare minigame score with other player via Spotpass.

The game will intentionally keep players from trying to purchase the games for full price, but can still be purchased after multiple warnings. When a player pays for full price, Rusty's past mentor Pappy Van Poodle will give him the items awarded from the minigames instead.

Development
Rusty's Real Deal Baseball was announced in a Nintendo Direct in 2014.  According to Satoru Iwata, the concept of the game was created with the theme of "good feelings".  The game's release date was announced via Twitter, and released in Japan in August 2013 and in North America in April 2014.

Reception

The game received generally favorable reviews, scoring a 74/100 on Metacritic.

The game was praised for the characters and humorous writing. Scott Thompson from IGN called the game "uncharacteristically dark" and "surprisingly funny". Chris Carter from Destructoid liked Rusty's unique dialogue and multiple choices of writing during haggling portions of the game. He appreciated Rusty's characteristics and storyline, and believed the game had "awkward silliness".

Notes

References

External links

2013 video games
Minigame compilations
Nintendo 3DS games
Nintendo 3DS eShop games
Nintendo 3DS-only games
Baseball video games
Free-to-play video games
Nintendo games
Video games developed in Japan
Video games scored by Kenji Yamamoto (composer, born 1964)